{{DISPLAYTITLE:Tau5 Serpentis}}

Tau5 Serpentis, Latinized from τ5 Serpentis, is a F-type main sequence star in the constellation of Serpens, approximately 160 light-years from Earth.  It has an apparent visual magnitude of approximately 5.938.

References

Serpens (constellation)
F-type main-sequence stars
Serpentis, 18
Serpentis, Tau5
139225
076424
BD+16 2807
5804